Innocence is a 2000 Australian film directed by Paul Cox. The film deals with the story of two separated lovers who meet again accidentally after decades and fall in love again.

The film was lauded by critics and was one of Cox's most successful films commercially.

Cast
 Julia Blake as Claire
 Bud Tingwell as Andreas Borg
 Kristine Van Pellicom as Young Claire
 Kenny Aernouts as Young Andreas
 Terry Norris as John
 Marta Dusseldorp as Monique
 Robert Menzies as David
 Chris Haywood as Minister
 Norman Kaye as Gerald
 Joey Kennedy as Sally
 Liz Windsor as Maudie

References

External links

Innocence at Australian Screen Online
Innocence at Ozmovies

2000 films
Australian drama films
Films directed by Paul Cox
2000s English-language films
2000s Australian films